Rob Kolar is an American singer-songwriter, producer, composer and actor.

Career
Kolar has been a founding member of such bands as Lemon Sun, He's My Brother She's My Sister (formed with his sister, Rachel, and future wife, Lauren Brown) and KOLARS (with wife Lauren).

As a member of He's My Brother She's My Sister, he toured extensively throughout the US, including such festivals as Bonnaroo, Summerfest, Firefly, Secret Garden Party and Austin City Limits. He performed with the group on an April 2013 episode of The Late Late Show with Craig Ferguson.

A composer for television, Kolar scores The Detour on TBS.

As an actor, Kolar co-starred in Monte Hellman's 2010 romantic thriller, Road to Nowhere.

Family
Kolar is the son of film producer Evzen Kolar (1950–2017) and Deborah (née Shaw), and maternal grandson of British actor Robert Shaw. He married bandmate Lauren Brown in September 2014.

References

External links
 

American singer-songwriters
American male singer-songwriters
American male actors
Living people
21st-century American singers
Year of birth missing (living people)
American people of Czech descent
American people of English descent
21st-century American male singers